Baltazar Leite Rebelo de Sousa, GCIH (April 16, 1921 in Lisbon, Santos o Velho – December 1, 2001 in Lisbon) was a Portuguese politician and a former minister and member of parliament and medicine professor.

Background
He was the only son of António Joaquim Rebelo de Sousa (Cabeceiras de Basto, Pedraça, Paço de Vides, April 8, 1860 – August 7, 1927), a landowner (already a widower of Rosa da Costa, whom he married in Angola and by whom he had five other sons António, Eduardo, Augusto, Álvaro and Óscar Rebelo de Sousa), and second wife Joaquina Leite da Silva, Gandarela, São Clemente, Celorico de Basto 1896? – April 16, 1975), daughter of Manuel Leite da Silva and wife and relative Deolinda Leite. His paternal grandparents were Manuel Joaquim Rebelo de Sousa, a trader, and wife Feliciana de Jesus, daughter of José Mendes de Magalhães and wife Teresa Dias do Nascimento de Jesus, who were also the parents of Baltasar Joaquim (born in 1859), Rosalinda do Nascimento, Bernardino Joaquim, Joaquim and Valentina do Nascimento Rebelo de Sousa.

Career
He was a licentiate in medicine from the Faculty of Medicine of the University of Lisbon. He started his career as a medical doctor.

He was a subsecretary of state for education and a national comissar of the Mocidade Portuguesa. He then became secretary of state and minister of the corporations and health, deputy to the Assembly of the Republic (Assembleia Nacional), vice-president of the Overseas Council, vice-president of the Acção Nacional Popular, Governor-General of Mozambique from 1968 until 1970, and finally the last Minister for the Overseas before the Carnation Revolution. In its aftermath, he went to his ministry where he stood most part of the day and communicated with the rest of the Portuguese Council of Ministers, who were seized in Quartel do Carmo (a military facility in Lisbon). He went into exile in Brazil.

He then became a higher education teacher in São Paulo, São Paulo and the administrator of a company of the Pirelli Group. He also had an active role in Luso-Brazilian associacions, such as the Associação Luso-Brasileira, of which he became the director, also being a member and president of the Curator Council of the Fundação Luso-Brasileira para o Desenvolvimento dos Países de Língua Portuguesa.

Decorations
He was a Grand Cross of the Order of Prince Henry (Ordem do Infante Dom Henrique), Grand Cross of the Order of Public Instruction, Grand Cross of the Order of the Southern Cross of Brazil, etc.

Family
He married in Lisbon in 1941 or thereabouts, in a simple ceremony with only two of his friends as witnesses, in a union not approved by both parents at the time, to Maria das Neves Fernandes Duarte (Covilhã, Conceição, July 30, 1921 – Lisbon, March 8, 2003), daughter of Joaquim das Neves (b. Covilhã, Erada, January 1, 1874) and wife Maria Rosa Fernandes Duarte (b. Covilhã, 1889?); paternal granddaughter of José Antunes das Neves (son of Francisco de Jesus and wife Maria Antunes) and wife Maria Florência (daughter of José Antunes Castanheira and wife Maria Florência), both born and married in Covilhã, Erada; and maternal granddaughter of Manuel Fernandes Duarte and wife Leonor Rosa; they had three children: 
 Marcelo Nuno Duarte Rebelo de Sousa
 António Jorge Duarte Rebelo de Sousa (b. Lisbon, São Sebastião da Pedreira, May 31, 1952), PhD in economics, married in Cascais, Estoril, to Maria Henriqueta Trigueiros de Aragão Pinto de Mesquita (b. December 9, 1952), daughter of Luís Fernando Mexia Pinto de Mesquita and wife (m. Castelo Branco, Alcains, January 8, 1951) Maria Isabel de Portugal Lobo Trigueiros de Aragão, of the Counts of an Idanha-a-Nova and Viscounts of o Outeiro (b. Castelo Branco, Alcains, December 28, 1921), and had issue:
  Miguel Pinto de Mesquita Rebelo de Sousa (b. Lisbon, São Domingos de Benfica, January 18, 1977), Economist, married to Rita Sofia Marques Alves das Neves Madeira (b. Lisbon, São Cristóvão e São Lourenço, July 13, 1977), Economist, daughter of António das Neves Madeira and wife Maria Manuela Marques Alves Rosa, and had issue:
 Duarte das Neves Madeira Rebelo de Sousa (b. Lisbon, São Domingos de Benfica, April 23, 2006)
 Maria das Neves Madeira Rebelo de Sousa (b. Lisbon, São Domingos de Benfica, January 7, 2009)
 Margarida Maria das Neves Madeira Rebelo de Sousa (b. Lisbon, São Domingos de Benfica, November 24, 2010)
 Luís Maria Pinto de Mesquita Rebelo de Sousa (b. September 30, 1979), Economist, married to Leonor Estrela de Lacerda (b. February 21, 1980), a Licentiate in Business Administration, daughter of Luís de Lacerda (March 30, 1952 - February 6, 1997) and wife Augusta Maria de Jesus Estrela (b. May 4, 1948), and had issue:
 Luís Maria de Lacerda Rebelo de Sousa (b. Cascais, Estoril, September 29, 2008)
 Mafalda Maria Pinto de Mesquita Rebelo de Sousa (b. Lisbon, São Domingos de Benfica, February 1, 1983), Lawyer (LL.M and Master in Law), married on May 30, 2009, to Bruno Vinga Santiago (b. August 14, 1976), Lawyer (LL.M. and Master in Law) and had issued:
Sebastião Rebelo de Sousa Santiago (b. Lisbon, Mártires, January 20, 2011)
Mafalda Maria Rebelo de Sousa Santiago (.b. Santa Maria Maior November 3, 2015)
 Pedro Miguel Duarte Rebelo de Sousa (b. Lisbon, April 29, 1955), a Licentiate in Law from the Faculty of Law of the University of Lisbon and a lawyer, married in Braga, at the Bom Jesus do Monte, on April 16, 1977, to Ana Margarida Lobato de Faria Sacchetti (b. Évora, Sé e São Pedro, October 26, 1956), daughter of António de Vilas-Boas Romano e Vasconcelos Barreto Ferraz Sacchetti (b. February 5, 1928), son of the 3rd Viscount of a Granja, and first wife as her first husband (m. Caminha, Moledo, May 27, 1951, and divorced) Rosa Maria de Bettencourt Rodrigues Lobato de Faria (b. Lisbon, Santa Isabel, April 20, 1932), a poet, and had issue:
 Mariana Lobato de Faria Sacchetti Rebelo de Sousa (São Paulo, São Paulo, April 27, 1979), a Licentiate in Law and a Lawyer, married on April 30, 2005, to Nuno Miguel Cadima de Oliveira
 Afonso Lobato de Faria Sacchetti Rebelo de Sousa (São Paulo, São Paulo, June 24, 1981)

References
 Costados Alentejanos, II, António Luís de Torres Cordovil Pestana de Vasconcelos, Edição do Autor, Évora 2006, N.º 41

Further reading
 Sousa, Marcelo Rebelo de, Baltasar Rebelo de Sousa - Fotobiografia, Lisboa, Betrand, 1999

External links

 Baltasar Leite Rebelo de Sousa's genealogy in a Portuguese genealogical site

1921 births
2001 deaths
Government ministers of Portugal
National Union (Portugal) politicians
Legislators in Portugal
People from Lisbon
University of Lisbon alumni